Öræfajökull ('Öræfi glacier' or 'wasteland glacier') is an ice-covered volcano in south-east Iceland.

The original Norse settlers named the volcano Knappafellsjǫkull (Modern Icelandic: Hnappafellsjökull ; 'knobs mountain glacier').  The current name, Öræfajökull, was eventually adopted after the 1362 eruption.

Description
Öræfajökull is located at the southern extremity of the Vatnajökull glacier and overlooking the Ring Road between Höfn and Vík. Geographically, Öræfajökull is considered part of Vatnajökull, and the area covered by glacier is within the boundary of Vatnajökull National Park.

Activity
Öræfajökull has erupted twice in historical times, in 1362 and 1728.

1362 eruption
In 1362, Knappafellsjökull erupted explosively, ejecting 10 cubic kilometres of tephra, similar in scale to the 1991 eruption of Mount Pinatubo.  The wealthy district of Litlahérað was destroyed by floods, pyroclastic flows and ashfall. Sailors reported pumice “in such masses that ships could hardly make their way through it.” Thick volcanic deposits obliterated farmland, and ash travelled as far as western Europe. More than 40 years passed before people again settled the area, which became known as Öræfi. The name literally means 'an area without harbour,' but it took on a meaning of 'wasteland' in Icelandic, as the 1362 eruption had drastically altered the environment around the mountain.  The volcano likewise took on the new name Öræfajökull.

1728 eruption
An eruption in August 1727-28 was smaller than 1362, though floods are known to have caused three fatalities when the meltwater swept their farm away.

2017 activity
Increased earthquake activity in the form of small tremors ranging from a depth of 1.5–10 km beneath the summit crater, began in August 2017 according to the Icelandic Meteorological Office.

The Aviation Colour Code of the United States was raised to yellow on 17 November 2017, after the appearance of an ice cauldron inside the main crater and increased geothermal activity under the glacier.

2018 activity
The seismic and geothermal activity which began in August 2017 continued into 2018, but at reduced levels. On 4 May 2018, the Icelandic Meteorological Office lowered the Aviation Colour Code to green.

See also
 Geography of Iceland
 Glaciers of Iceland
 Iceland plume
 List of lakes of Iceland
 List of islands of Iceland
 List of volcanoes in Iceland
 List of rivers of Iceland
 Volcanism of Iceland
 Waterfalls of Iceland

References

External links
 Öræfajökull in the Catalogue of Icelandic Volcanoes
 Volcano Images of Europe
   Photos of Öræfajökull www.Icelandportfolio.com
 Öræfajökull at the Global Volcanism Program
 Google Earth view
 Official Website of Vatnajökull National Park

Southern Region (Iceland)
Stratovolcanoes of Iceland
Mountains of Iceland
Glaciers of Iceland
VEI-6 volcanoes
Active volcanoes
Öræfajökull Belt
Two-thousanders of Iceland
1362
1727 natural disasters
Subglacial calderas
Subglacial volcanoes of Iceland
Calderas of Iceland
Central volcanoes of Iceland